The Woman Who Was Nothing is a 1917 British silent crime film directed by Maurice Elvey and starring Lilian Braithwaite, Madge Titheradge and George Tulley. It was based on a novel by Tom Gallon. The screenplay concerns a female ex-convict who steals the identity of a dying heiress.

Cast
 Lilian Braithwaite - The Wife
 Madge Titheradge - Brenda
 George Tulley - Richard Marsden
 Leon M. Lion - Ferret
 Lyston Lyle - Financier
 Ruth Mackay - Duchess
 Douglas Munro - Chairman
 Marjorie Day - Hope Dacre

References

External links

1917 films
British silent feature films
1917 crime films
1910s English-language films
Films directed by Maurice Elvey
British black-and-white films
British crime films
1910s British films